Alexander Dallas Bache (July 19, 1806 – February 17, 1867) was an American physicist, scientist, and surveyor who erected coastal fortifications and conducted a detailed survey to map the mideastern United States coastline. Originally an army engineer, he later became Superintendent of the United States Coast Survey, and built it into the foremost scientific institution in the country before the Civil War.

Early life and family

Alexander Bache was born in Philadelphia, the son of Richard Bache, Jr., and Sophia Burrell Dallas Bache. He came from a prominent family as he was the nephew of Vice-President George M. Dallas and naval hero Alexander J. Dallas. He was the grandson of Secretary of the Treasury Alexander Dallas and was the great-grandson of Benjamin Franklin.

United States Army
After graduating from the United States Military Academy at West Point in 1825, as first in his class, he was an assistant professor of engineering there for some time. As a second lieutenant in the United States Army Corps of Engineers, he was engaged in the construction of Fort Adams in Newport, Rhode Island. Bache resigned from the Army on June 1, 1829.

Career
Bache was a professor of natural philosophy and chemistry at the University of Pennsylvania from 1828 to 1841 and again from 1842 to 1843. He spent 1836–1838 in Europe on behalf of the trustees of what became Girard College; he was named president of the college after his return. Abroad, he examined European education systems, and on his return he published a valuable report. From 1839 to 1842, he served as the first president of Central High School of Philadelphia, one of the oldest public high schools in the United States.

In 1843, on the death of Professor Ferdinand Rudolph Hassler, Bache was appointed superintendent of the United States Coast Survey. He convinced the United States Congress of the value of this work and, by means of the liberal aid it granted, he completed the mapping of the whole coast by a skillful division of labor and the erection of numerous observing stations. In addition, geomagnetic and meteorological data were collected. Bache served as head of the Coast Survey for 24 years (until his death).

Awards and honors

 Elected a member of the American Philosophical Society in 1829.
 Elected an Associate Fellow of the American Academy of Arts and Sciences in 1845. 
 Elected a Fellow of the Royal Society of Edinburgh on March 15, 1858, 
 Elected Foreign Member of the Royal Society on May 24, 1860.

After the Civil War, Bache was elected a 3rd Class Companion of the Military Order of the Loyal Legion of the United States (MOLLUS) in consideration of his contributions to the war effort.

Personal life
He married Nancy Clark Fowler on September 30, 1838, at Newport, Rhode Island. She was born in Newport and died on January 13, 1870, in Philadelphia. She assisted in the publication of much of his work. They adopted one son, Henry Wood Bache (1839–November 7, 1878, at Bristol on Long Island, New York).

Death

He died at Newport, Rhode Island, on February 17, 1867, from "softening of the brain". He was buried in the Congressional Cemetery in Washington, D.C., under a monument designed by architect Henry Hobson Richardson.

Legacy
Two survey ships were named for him, the A. D. Bache of 1871 and its successor in 1901.

The cydippid ctenophore Pleurobrachia bachei A. Agassiz, 1860 was named for him; it was discovered in 1859 by Alexander Agassiz who was working as an engineer on a ship surveying the United States/Canada boundary between Washington State and British Columbia.

Loma Prieta peak in the Santa Cruz mountains once bore his name - Mount Bache. The name is no longer in use. 

A K-8 public elementary school in Philadelphia, Pennsylvania (Bache-Martin School) has its 5th-8th grade building named after him.

See also

Alexander Dallas Bache Monument – Bache's tomb in the Congressional Cemetery in Washington, D.C..
Alexander Dallas Bache School, Philadelphia
Alexander Bache U.S. Coast Survey Line
Richard Bache – Bache's paternal grandfather; son-in-law of Benjamin Franklin
Richard Bache, Jr. – Bache's father
Sarah Franklin Bache – Bache's paternal grandmother; daughter of Benjamin Franklin

Notes

References
 
 
 
 

 

Attribution:

External links

Finding Aid to Alexander Dallas Bache Papers, 1821–1869
National Academy of Sciences Biographical Memoir
The Bache Years (National Oceanic and Atmospheric Administration Central Library)
Alexander Dallas Bache: Leader of American Science and Second Superintendent of the United States Coast Survey (National Oceanic and Atmospheric Administration)

1806 births
1867 deaths
United States Coast Survey personnel
National Oceanic and Atmospheric Administration
American physicists
United States Military Academy alumni
University of Pennsylvania faculty
Burials at the Congressional Cemetery
Foreign Members of the Royal Society
Franklin family
Scientists from Philadelphia
Honorary Fellows of the Royal Society of Edinburgh
Fellows of the American Academy of Arts and Sciences
United States Army officers
American chemists
Engineers from Pennsylvania
Members of the United States National Academy of Sciences
Presidents of the United States National Academy of Sciences